Scott Travis Beavers (born February 17, 1967) is a former American football offensive lineman in the National Football League for the Denver Broncos. He played collegiately for Georgia Tech Yellow Jackets football.

External links
NFL.com player page

Living people
1967 births
Players of American football from Atlanta
American football offensive linemen
Georgia Tech Yellow Jackets football players
Denver Broncos players